Fasi may refer to :

 Persons 
 Ahmad ibn Idris al-Fasi (1760–1837), Moroccan Sufi writer and religious leader
 Fasi Zaka (born 1976), Pakistani journalist
 Frank Fasi (1920–2010), United States politician

 Places and jurisdictions 
 Phasis (town) (now Poti), a former archbishopric in Lazica, Georgia, now a Latin titular see